John Slim may refer to:
 John Slim, 2nd Viscount Slim, British peer, soldier and businessman
 John Slim (wrestler), British wrestler

See also
 Slim John, a 1969 BBC English language instruction serial